Kevin Robert Swords (born July 1, 1960 in Chicago, Illinois) is a former USA international rugby player. The 6’7", 260 lb, lock, Sports Illustrated Athlete of the Month, who at the time of his retirement was the most-capped US Eagle in history, won 36 caps between 1985 and 1994 and was the first American tapped to play for the world-renowned Barbarians. 
His 6'10" brother Brian Swords also played for the Eagles as a lock. Brian, a much revered competitor and teammate introduced Kevin to Rugby while they both attended the College of the Holy Cross.  Kevin Swords is the nephew of former president of the College of the Holy Cross, Rev. Raymond J. Swords, S. J., and the uncle of Carolyn Swords.

Swords made his debut against Japan in 1985 and played in both the 1987 and 1991 World Cups, captaining the Eagles in the latter.

In 2002 he was made an honorary member of the Holy Cross Varsity Club Hall of Fame.
In 2014 he was inducted into the United States Rugby Federation Hall of Fame.

References

1960 births
Living people
American rugby union players
Rugby union locks
United States international rugby union players